Rodolfo da Graça Barata Franco Vacas (born 3 December 1987), known as Rodolfo Barata, is a Portuguese footballer who plays as a goalkeeper for Casa Pia AC.

Club career
He made his professional debut in the Segunda Liga for Olhanense on 22 January 2017 against Famalicão.

References

External links
 

1987 births
Footballers from Lisbon
Living people
Portuguese footballers
Association football goalkeepers
Real S.C. players
S.U. Sintrense players
Eléctrico F.C. players
C.D. Fátima players
S.C. Olhanense players
C.D. Trofense players
Casa Pia A.C. players
Liga Portugal 2 players